= Altyre Castle =

Altyre Castle was a castle located south of Forres in Moray, Scotland.

Mound of former castle

The castle ruins are located in the grounds of the Altyre Estate. Originally built as a motte and bailey with a later tower erected on the site. The castle was later replaced by Altyre house and became ruinous.

The former 13th century chapel lies to the north of the former castle.
